Rocky Ward is an American college baseball coach, most recently the head coach of the New Mexico State Aggies baseball program  He was given that position before the 2003 season and left after the 2014 season to join Hittinguru 3D. He had previously had the same position from 1997 through 2000. In the intervening years, his father, Hall-of-Famer Gary Ward, worked as head coach of the Aggies while Rocky assisted.

Playing career
Ward first enrolled at Connors State, which compiled at 72–13 record in 1985. He then played one season at Western Oklahoma State before completing his eligibility at Oklahoma State while playing for his father. In his two seasons in Stillwater, the Cowboys reached the 1987 College World Series final and amassed a 61–8 record in 1988 and were at the top the Baseball America poll for 12 weeks.

Coaching career
After graduating from Oklahoma State, Ward established the Mid-America Baseball School, and was marketing director and an instructor with the program which helped develop the skills of young players until 1994, when he became an assistant coach at Indianapolis. After one season with the Greyhounds, he moved to Kansas State, where he spent two years as recruiting co-ordinator and worked with infielders and hitters. He earned the head coaching position at New Mexico State beginning in 1997 and completed four seasons before giving way to his father. After two seasons as an assistant, he was again in charge of the Aggies. Since then, New Mexico State has appeared in the NCAA Tournament twice and won the Western Athletic Conference regular season title once.

Ward left at the end of the 2014 season as the most successful coach in NMSU history (455), the most All-Americans (10), the most post-season appearances (11), the most NCAA tournament appearances (3). He is now the CEO of Guru Products LLC which provides development and sales for Guru Training Systems based in Belgium. GTS has developed the first artificially intelligent hitting coach, called the Swinguru Hitting.

Head coaching record
The table below reflects Ward's record as a head coach.

See also
List of current NCAA Division I baseball coaches

References

Living people
1968 births
Connors State Cowboys baseball players
Indianapolis Greyhounds baseball coaches
Kansas State Wildcats baseball coaches
New Mexico State Aggies baseball coaches
Oklahoma State Cowboys baseball coaches
Western Oklahoma State Pioneers baseball players